The OVRO 40 meter Telescope is a radio telescope at the Owens Valley Radio Observatory near Big Pine, California, US. It is owned and operated by Caltech.   The telescope is easily visible from the section of US highway 395 just north of Big Pine.

History
Construction of the telescope was funded by the National Science Foundation, as a prototype for a planned astronomical interferometer at Owens Valley. The  diameter prototype was completed in 1968, but by the end of the decade plans for the interferometer were cancelled in favour of the Very Large Array.

Starting in 1969, it was also sometimes used as a very long baseline interferometry (VLBI) station, in conjunction with more distant observatories. When operating with the Parkes telescope in Australia it provided the longest baseline then available in the world, and hence the highest angular resolution of 0.4 milliarcseconds. VLBI operations continued until 1991, when they were retired in favour of the more capable Very Long Baseline Array.

Current use
In 2007 the telescope was re-purposed for a dedicated blazar monitoring campaign, in support of the Fermi Gamma-ray Space Telescope which launched in 2008 and observes blazars in gamma rays.  the telescope takes regular measurements of over 1800 blazars, by observing each one at  twice a week.

In popular culture
Much of the 1996 film The Arrival was filmed at Owens Valley Radio Observatory, and the climactic fight scene occurred in, and on the primary mirror of, the 40 meter telescope.

See also
 List of observatories

References

External links 

 The Owens Valley Radio Observatory
 The OVRO 40M Telescope Fermi Blazar Monitoring Program

Radio telescopes
Astronomical observatories in California
Buildings and structures in Inyo County, California